Jenkina is a genus of sponges belonging to the family Jenkinidae.

The species of this genus are found in Antarctica.

Species:

Jenkina articulata 
Jenkina glabra 
Jenkina hiberna

References

Leucosolenida
Sponge genera